Wayne County Airport  is a public use airport located two nautical miles (3.7 km) north of the central business district of Monticello, a city in Wayne County, Kentucky, United States. It is owned by the Wayne County Airport Board. According to the FAA's National Plan of Integrated Airport Systems for 2009–2013, it is categorized as a general aviation facility.

Although many U.S. airports use the same three-letter location identifier for the FAA and IATA, this facility is assigned EKQ by the FAA but has no designation from the IATA.

Facilities and aircraft
It has one runway designated 3/21 with an asphalt surface measuring 4,000 by 75 feet (1,219 x 23 m).

For the 12-month period ending September 21, 2007, the airport had 8,437 aircraft operations, an average of 23 per day: 89% general aviation, 9% air taxi, and 2% military. At that time there were 22 aircraft based at this airport: 68% single-engine, 23% multi-engine and 9% helicopter.

References

External links
 Aerial image as of 11 March 1997 from USGS The National Map
 

Airports in Kentucky
Buildings and structures in Wayne County, Kentucky
Transportation in Wayne County, Kentucky